John Frederick Wells (November 25, 1922 – October 23, 1993) was a pitcher in Major League Baseball. He pitched in 4 games (2 of them starts) for the Brooklyn Dodgers during the 1944 season.

Born in Junction City, Kansas, Wells died in Olean, New York.

References

External links

Major League Baseball pitchers
Brooklyn Dodgers players
1922 births
1993 deaths
Baseball players from Kansas
Olean Oilers players
New Orleans Pelicans (baseball) players
Mobile Bears players
Augusta Tigers players
Nashville Vols players
Lincoln A's players